Jinx is a comic book series published first by Caliber Comics and then Image Comics, written and drawn by Brian Michael Bendis.

Synopsis
Jinx is a prequel to the same author's A.K.A. Goldfish, telling the story of Jinx, a female bounty hunter and her relationship with David Goldfish, con-artist and wanted felon. Jinx has also crossed over with the detective series Sam and Twitch. There she helps them track down a bounty hunter that has become mentally deranged.

The story is a loose adaptation of Sergio Leone's  The Good, the Bad and the Ugly, but resets it in the modern crime noir genre.

Models 
 D.D. Byrne as Jinx
 John Skrtic as Goldfish
 Brian Michael Bendis as Columbia
 Mike Sangiacomo as Office Mike
 David Mack as Dead Mug Number 1
 James D. Hudnall as Dead Mug Number 2
 Ceray Doss as Becky
 Jared Bendis as Ricky Ricketts
 Michael Johnson as Money B
 Dan Berman as Street Loser 1
 Frisco as Street Loser 2
 Marc Andreyko as Reverend Peter
 Curtis as Apollo
 Keith Konajcik as Motormouth Mug
 Tom Zjaba as Silent Mug
 Jimmy Williams as Danny
 Michael Hahn as Young Danny
 Tia Rachten as Young Jinx
 Kevin Snorteland as Rob
 Genevieve Halton as the chain smokin' foul mouthed crack whore
 Kyra Kester as Lauren Bacall

Film adaptation
In 2004, Charlize Theron signed on to produce and star in a film adapted from Jinx for Universal Pictures. No progress was made on the project and is presumably canceled.

References

External links

Comics characters introduced in 1995
Comics by Brian Michael Bendis
Image Comics titles
1995 comics debuts
Image Comics female characters
Crime comics